Hung Yuan-hsi (born 27 July 2001) is a Taiwanese male artistic gymnast who will represent Chinese Taipei at the 2020 Summer Olympics.

Career 
Hung was initially selected as an alternate for the 2020 Olympic Games. However, when Yu Chao-wei tore his ACL, Hung was added to the team.

References

External links 
 

2001 births
Living people
Taiwanese male artistic gymnasts
Gymnasts at the 2020 Summer Olympics
Olympic gymnasts of Taiwan
21st-century Taiwanese people